Frankie Laine was the title of three self-titled 10-inch albums by Frankie Laine that were simultaneously issued by his label Mercury Records in the summer of 1950.

The LPs compiled previously released sides along with several new productions.

The strongest LP of the three was the third one (cat. nr. MG 25027), compiling Laine's biggest hits like "Lucky Old Sun", "Mule Train", and "Cry of the Wild Goose" and two unreleased tracks – "God Bless the Child" and "Don't Cry, Little Children". The second one (MG 25026) was judged by Billboard as containing "second-string" songs and being released primarily with the intention of "latching onto the coin of [the singer's] large following," and the first (MG 25025) was "the weakest by comparison" with the other two, but was still expected to provide "reasonably sizable returns".

Track listings

MG 25025

MG 25026

MG 25027

References 

1950 albums
Frankie Laine albums
Mercury Records albums